Daqiao is a town of Mianning County in the northwest of the Liangshan Yi Autonomous Prefecture, southern Sichuan province, China, located at the southern end of a peninsula abutting into the Beiji River (北基河) Dam  north of the county seat. , it has eight villages under its administration.

See also 
 List of township-level divisions of Sichuan

References 

Township-level divisions of Sichuan
Mianning County